Matt Fellowes (born February 27, 1975) is an American financial technology entrepreneur. He is the founder and CEO of United Income, a retirement-focused online investment management and financial planning company based in Washington, D.C. He previously founded financial planning technology company HelloWallet, which was acquired by Morningstar, Inc. in 2014 for $52.5 million.

Education 
Fellowes holds a Ph.D. from the University of North Carolina, Chapel Hill, a Master's in Public Policy from Georgetown University, and a B.A. from St. Lawrence University.

Career 
Fellowes served as a Brookings Institution fellow from April 2004 to April 2008. His academic research focused on consumer finance, particularly with regard to poverty, household debt, and retirement planning. In 2008, he left Brookings to found financial planning technology company HelloWallet with a $1 million grant from the Rockefeller Foundation. Following the acquisition of HelloWallet by Morningstar, Inc. in 2014, Fellowes served as Chief Innovation Officer at Morningstar. In 2016, with $5 million in seed funding from his own resources, Morningstar, and eBay founder Pierre Omidyar's Omidyar Network, Fellowes founded online financial planning and investment management company United Income. United Income was acquired by Capital One Financial in August 2019.

Awards 
 Named a “Top 100 Business Game Changer” by the Huffington Post in 2010. 
 Named a “2013 Tech Titan” by The Washingtonian.

References 

1975 births
Living people
American technology chief executives